The First, the Last is a Belgian-French drama film written, directed by and starring Bouli Lanners. It was shown in the Panorama section at the 66th Berlin International Film Festival. At Berlin, it won the Prize of the Ecumenical Jury and the Europa Cinemas Label. It received eight nominations at the 7th Magritte Awards, winning five, including Best Film and Best Director for Lanners.

Cast
 Albert Dupontel as Cochise
 Bouli Lanners as Gilou
 Suzanne Clément as Clara
 Michael Lonsdale as Jean-Berchmans
 David Murgia as Willy
 Aurore Broutin as Esther
 Philippe Rebbot as Jésus
 Serge Riaboukine as The Head Hunters
 Lionel Abelanski as The warehouse man
 Max von Sydow as The undertaker

Accolades

References

External links
 

2016 films
2016 drama films
Belgian drama films
French drama films
2010s French-language films
Magritte Award winners
Films directed by Bouli Lanners
2010s French films